Reuben Mednikoff (1906–1972), was a British surrealist artist.

Mednikoff was born in London in 1906 into a Jewish family of Russian ancestry. He trained at Saint Martin's School of Art.

He was married to Grace Pailthorpe, a surgeon and artist 23 years his senior.

Refercnes

1906 births
1972 deaths
Alumni of Saint Martin's School of Art
British surrealist artists
20th-century English artists
Artists from London